The 2022 FIBA U16 Women's Asian Championship was an international under-16 basketball tournament that was held from 24 to 30 June 2022 in Amman, Jordan.

The tournament was last held in 2017. The next edition was supposed to be held from 5–10 April 2020 in Canberra, Australia, which was cancelled by FIBA due to the COVID-19 pandemic.

The sixth edition of the biennial competition, this was also the qualifying tournament for FIBA Asia in the 2022 FIBA U17 Women's Basketball World Cup in Hungary.

Qualified teams 
For Division A:

 Semifinalists of the 2017 FIBA Under-16 Women's Asian Championship:
 
 
 
 
 5th-7th placers of the 2017 FIBA Under-16 Women's Asian Championship:
 
 
 
 Division B winners at the 2017 FIBA Under-16 Women's Asian Championship:
 

For Division B:

 The host nation:
 
 Division A 8th placers at the 2017 FIBA Under-16 Women's Asian Championship, being relegated to Division B:
 
 3rd-4th placers of the 2018 FIBA Under-15 Women's Oceania Championship:
 
 
 Teams from FIBA Asia on a first-come first-registered basis:

Divisions
Division A includes the semifinalists of the previous championship, along with the losing quarterfinalists ranking fifth to seventh places. The winner of Division B of the previous championship will also join Division A, as per tournament procedure.

Division B includes the host team, third and fourth-place winners of the 2018 FIBA Under-15 Women's Oceania Championship and the Division A 8th Placer, along with the registered teams allotted for FIBA Asia.

Therefore, the invitation was extended to other FIBA Asia teams in order to complete the eight participants for Division B.

Included were the FIBA World Rankings prior to the tournament. Rosters for both divisions were already confirmed on 23 June 2022.

Division A
All times are local (UTC+03:00)

Preliminary round

Group A

Knockout round

Bracket

Semifinals

Third place game

Final

Final standing

Division B
All times are local (UTC+03:00)

Preliminary round

Group A

Group B

Knockout round

Bracket

Qualification to Semifinals

Semifinals

Seventh place game

Fifth place game

Third place game

Final

Final standing

References

External links
 2022 FIBA U16 Women's Asian Championship Division A
 2022 FIBA U16 Women's Asian Championship Division B

2022
2022 in Asian women's sport
2022 in Jordanian sport
2022 in women's basketball
basketball
2021–22 in Asian basketball
International basketball competitions hosted by Jordan
June 2022 sports events in Asia